Margarites vorticiferus, common name the vortex margarite, is a species of sea snail, a marine gastropod mollusk in the family Margaritidae.

Description
The size of the salmon pink shell varies between 8 mm and 22 mm.

Distribution
This marine species occurs in Asian arctic waters and from Alaska to Southern California, USA;

References

 Turgeon, D.D., et al. 1998. Common and scientific names of aquatic invertebrates of the United States and Canada. American Fisheries Society Special Publication 26 page(s): 61
 Gulbin V.V. & Chaban E.M. (2012) Annotated list of shell-bearing gastropods of Commander Islands. Part I. The Bulletin of the Russian Far East Malacological Society 15-16: 5–30

External links
 To Encyclopedia of Life
 To World Register of Marine Species

vorticiferus
Gastropods described in 1873